Currently there are 1650 govt medical college seats in Kerala with the approval of Idukki govt medical college.
The following is a list of government, private, and self-financing medical institutions in Kerala.

Medical colleges

Government medical colleges

Private self-financing

Dental colleges 
 PSM College of Dental Science and Research, Akkikavu, Thrissur
 Pushpagiri College of Dental Sciences,Pushpagiri Medicity,Perumthuruthy, Thiruvalla, Kerala

Ayurveda colleges
 Government Ayurveda Medical College Kannur, Medical College P O, Pariyaram, Kannur

See also
KEAM
List of engineering colleges in Kerala
List of institutions of higher education in Kerala

References

External links
Official website of CEE

 
Kerala
Medical colleges